Sefwi or Sehwi may refer to:
 Sefwi people, an ethnic group of Ghana
 Sehwi language, their language

Language and nationality disambiguation pages